Ronald Tapiwa Pfumbidzai (born 25 December 1994) is a Zimbabwean footballer who plays as a defender for Chippa United and the Zimbabwe national football team.

At the youth level he captained his team in the 2013 COSAFA U-20 Cup and later played in 2015 Africa U-23 Cup of Nations qualiers.

References

External links

1994 births
Living people
CAPS United players
Hobro IK players
Bloemfontein Celtic F.C. players
Chippa United F.C. players
South African Premier Division players
Zimbabwean footballers
Zimbabwe international footballers
Association football defenders
2019 Africa Cup of Nations players
Zimbabwean expatriate footballers
Expatriate men's footballers in Denmark
Zimbabwean expatriate sportspeople in Denmark
Expatriate soccer players in South Africa
Zimbabwean expatriate sportspeople in South Africa
Zimbabwe under-20 international footballers